7th & Richards / Township 9 is a side platformed Sacramento RT Light Rail station in Sacramento, California, United States. The station was opened on June 15, 2012, and is operated by the Sacramento Regional Transit District. It is currently the northern terminus of the Green Line and is the only RT light rail station exclusively served by the Green Line, which will ultimately provide service to the Sacramento International Airport upon future build-out. Greyhound Lines's Sacramento bus depot is near the station, at 420 Richards Boulevard.  

It is located along Richards Boulevard at North 7th Street in the River District, north of Downtown Sacramento. Its opening coincided with the completion of a  extension of track at a cost of $44 million as the first new station constructed as part of the Green Line. Its opening is envisioned to serve as a catalyst for the redevelopment of the River District by city officials.

Platforms and tracks

References

Sacramento Regional Transit light rail stations
Railway stations in the United States opened in 2012